Felina is a 2001 Venezuelan telenovela produced by Venevisión and distributed by Venevisión International. The telenovela was written by Vivel Nouel and stars Gabriela Vergara and Guillermo Dávila as the main protagonists.

Plot
Daniela is a beautiful young woman with a fierce personality to fight for justice that has led her to get into trouble since childhood. After constantly getting into trouble with the authorities of the town, she decides to move to the capital city to start a new life. There she will meet Abel, a nice and unusual man with whom they will form an unusual relationship.

Cast
 Gabriela Vergara-- Daniela
 Guillermo Dávila-- Abel
 Fedra López-- Mara
 Arnaldo André-- Asdrúbal
 Miriam Ochoa-- Estefanía
 Jorge Palacios-- Bernardo
 Ana Castell-- Yarima
 Olga Henríquez-- María del Valle
 Laura Brey - 
 Belén Peláez-- Lily
 Javier Valcárcel-- Segundo
 Sonia Villamizar-- Tatiana
 Lourdes Martínez-- Lissette
 Judith Vásquez-- Leticia
 Saúl Martínez-- Bruno
 Roque Valero-- Agapito
 Flavia Gleske-- Lula
 Eva Blanco-- Margot
 José Oliva-- Don Atilio
 José Rubens-- Leonardo
 Esther Orjuela-- Rosario
 Karen Bendayan-- Lucero
 Patty Oliveros-- Laurita
 Flor Karina Zambrano-- Victoria
 Verushka Scalia-- Sugeidi
 Pedro Padrino-- Florentino Cueva

References

External links
Felina at the Internet Movie Database

Venevisión telenovelas
2001 telenovelas
Venezuelan telenovelas
2001 Venezuelan television series debuts
2001 Venezuelan television series endings
Spanish-language telenovelas
Television shows set in Venezuela